Clarence Kirschman Streit (January 21, 1896 – July 6, 1986) was an American journalist who played a prominent role in the Atlanticist and world federalist movements.

Life and career
Streit was born in California, Missouri, the son of Emma (Kirschman) and Louis Leland Streit. Of Palatine German origin, he moved with his family to Missoula, Montana, in 1911. In Missoula, he founded the Konah, a high school paper that is now one of the oldest in the United States in continuous publication. While a student at Montana State University (now the University of Montana), he volunteered for military service during World War I, serving in an Intelligence unit in France and assisting the American delegation at the Conference of Versailles.  He was a Rhodes scholar at University of Oxford in 1920.  He married Jeanne Defrance in Paris in 1921, after which he became a foreign correspondent for The New York Times.

In 1929, he was assigned to cover the League of Nations in Switzerland, where he witnessed the League's slow disintegration and collapse. That experience, coupled with the rise of totalitarian regimes in Europe, convinced him that mankind's best hope was a federal union of democracies, modeled on American federalism. This led him to write Union Now, a book advocating the political integration of the democracies of Western Europe (including their colonies) and the other English-speaking countries at that time (the United States, Canada, Australia, New Zealand, and South Africa). The book was published in 1939, on the eve of World War II. It had sold over 300,000 copies by 1972.

In the aftermath of the book's publication, Streit founded Federal Union, Inc. (later renamed the Association to Unite the Democracies) to promote his vision. Seeking what he described as "a man of national stature" to lend credence to his efforts, he was able to secure the support of Supreme Court Justice Owen Roberts, who would be a friend and collaborator in subsequent years. In 1949, Streit joined the board of the Roberts-chaired Atlantic Union Committee, which sought to pressure Congress to pursue a federation of democratic states.

The Streit Council, a successor organization to the Association to Unite the Democracies, was named after him.

Personal life
He was married to Jeanne Defrance of Lille, France, niece of French jurist Fernand Payen, known for defending Marechal Petain in his trial for treason. They met at a bus stop at the Place de l'Opéra in 1920. His daughter, Jeanette Streit (1924-2012), married Felix Rohatyn in 1956; they divorced in 1979.

Publications
 "Where Iron is, there is the Fatherland!" New York: B. W. Huebsch (1920).
"A note on the relation of privilege and monopoly to war."
 Union Now: A Proposal for an Atlantic Federal Union of the Free. England: Butler & Tanner (1939). Full text.
 Freedom Against Itself. New York: Harper (1954).
 Clarence K. Streit's The Unknown Turks: Mustafa Kemal Paşa, Nationalist Ankara and Daily Life in Anatolia, January–March 1921, revised, edited, and annotated by Heath W. Lowry. Istanbul: Bahçeşehir University Press (2011).

References

External links
 The Streit Council
 Clarence Streit Papers (University of Montana Archives)
 Clarence K. Streit Papers (Library of Congress)

1896 births
1986 deaths
The New York Times writers
Writers from Missoula, Montana
Journalists from Montana
American people of German descent
World federalist activists
People from California, Missouri
20th-century American journalists
American male journalists